Auckland is the largest city in New Zealand.

Auckland may also refer to:

Places

New Zealand
Auckland isthmus, the isthmus and central suburbs of Auckland
Auckland City, the local government district of central Auckland until 2010
Auckland Islands, a sub-Antarctic archipelago
Auckland Island, the main island of the Auckland Islands
Auckland Province, a former province
Auckland Region, the local government region that includes the Auckland metropolitan area
Auckland Council, the local government authority for the Auckland Region

Canada
Saint-Isidore-d'Auckland, a village in Quebec

South Africa
Auckland Park, a suburb of Johannesburg

South Korea
Mount Auckland or Hallasan, a peak on Jeju Island

United Kingdom
Auckland Castle, residence of the Bishop of Durham in Bishop Auckland
Bishop Auckland, County Durham, England

United States
Auckland, California, unincorporated community in Tulare County

People
Auckland Colvin (1838–1908), British colonial administrator
Auckland Geddes (1879–1954), British politician and diplomat
Baron Auckland, a barony and earldom in the peerages of Ireland and of Great Britain
William Eden, 1st Baron Auckland (1744–1814)
George Eden, 1st Earl of Auckland (1784–1849) 
Robert Eden, 3rd Baron Auckland (1799–1870)
Adam Auckland (born 1993), English professional squash player
George Auckland, British television executive
James Auckland (born 1980), British tennis player

Sport
Auckland (Mitre 10 Cup), a professional rugby union team in Auckland, New Zealand
Auckland (women's field hockey team), an amateur team in Auckland, New Zealand

Other uses
Auckland (Countess of Ranfurly's Own) and Northland Regiment, a Territorial Force Battalion of the Royal New Zealand Infantry Regiment
Auckland (wine), a New Zealand wine

See also
Aukland (disambiguation)
Oakland (disambiguation)